Mill Office and Post Office is a registered historic building in Woodsdale, Butler County, Ohio. It was used as department store and a US Post office from 1850 to 1874. It was listed in the National Register on November 1, 1984. The area is an Augspurger Amish and Mennonite settlement.

Notes

External links
Ohio Historic Inventory

Buildings and structures in Butler County, Ohio
National Register of Historic Places in Butler County, Ohio
Post office buildings on the National Register of Historic Places in Ohio